Season two of Seinfeld, an American television series created by Jerry Seinfeld and Larry David, began airing on January 23, 1991, on NBC.

Because of the commencement of the first Gulf War, the second season's premiere was postponed one week. The season comprised 12 episodes, and concluded its initial airing on June 26, 1991. It introduced a number of characters who played significant roles in later episodes, such as Jerry's Uncle Leo and Jerry's neighbor Newman.

Filming of the show moved from Hollywood to Studio City, Los Angeles. One episode, "The Bet", remained unfilmed, as it was considered too provocative by the network, as well as several cast and crew members. Two new writers joined the writing staff, Larry Charles and Peter Mehlman, who would continue to write for the show in later seasons. Even though season two started out with poor ratings, bringing the season to a two-month hiatus, the rest of the season was positively received by critics and was nominated for three Primetime Emmy Awards.

A Seasons 1 and 2 DVD box set was released by Sony Pictures Home Entertainment in the United States and Canada on November 23, 2004, 13 years after it completed broadcast on television. In addition to every episode from the two seasons, the DVD release features an episode from the third season that was held over, bonus material, including deleted scenes, inside looks, bloopers, and commentaries. Four million copies of the DVD were sold by the end of the year, making it one of the best-selling DVDs of all time.

Cast
The show features an ensemble cast of four characters: Jerry Seinfeld stars as a fictional version of himself; Jason Alexander portrays Seinfeld's neurotic friend George Costanza; Julia Louis-Dreyfus plays Elaine Benes, Seinfeld's ex-girlfriend; and Michael Richards stars as Seinfeld's neighbor Kramer. Matthew Gilbert of The Boston Globe noted the characters' evolution during the season: "As the seasons progress, you can see Michael Richards turn Kramer  from a vague eccentric  into a stylized creation who redefined TV's quirky-neighbor type with Danny Kaye accents. You can see Julia Louis-Dreyfus  develop Elaine from a puffy-haired gal pal (who wasn't in the pilot) into a delightfully petty urbanite. And you can see Jason Alexander push George from "a blatant Woody Allen impression", as the actor acknowledges, into a more offensive and hyperactive neurotic."

The season introduced several characters who returned later on the show. The episode "The Pony Remark" featured the second appearance of Helen and Morty Seinfeld, both of whom had previously appeared in the season 1 episode "The Stake Out". In "The Stakeout", Morty was portrayed by Phil Bruns; however, David and Seinfeld wanted the character to be harsher, and re-cast him with Barney Martin, who auditioned for the part on October 15, 1990, at 12:45 pm. Martin was unaware that another actor had already established the part. Helen was portrayed by Liz Sheridan, who had played her in "The Stake Out". The same episode introduced Jerry's uncle Leo, portrayed by Len Lesser, who was known for his acting in gangster films such as The Outlaw Josey Wales and Kelly's Heroes. When Lesser auditioned for the part on October 22, 1990, he incited laughs from David, Seinfeld, and casting director Marc Hirschfeld, but did not understand why, because he did not think his lines were funny. Herschfield stated that when Lesser had auditioned it was clear that he was the right actor for the part. "The Revenge" features the first appearance by Newman (voiced by David), a suicidal man who lives in Jerry's apartment building. In "The Revenge", Newman remained out of sight, although he appeared in a deleted scene. Before this scene was cut, William Thomas, Jr. had been cast for the part. Although the writing staff never intended for Newman to return to the show, the idea of having Wayne Knight as a neighbor appealed to them. Therefore, Knight was re-cast in the role of Newman for the season 3 episode "The Suicide".

Production

Castle Rock Entertainment produced Seinfeld, and the show was distributed by Columbia Pictures Television and Columbia TriStar Television. Seinfeld was aired on NBC in the United States. The producers of the show were Larry David, George Shapiro and Howard West. Tom Cherones directed all episodes of the season. Series co-creators David and Jerry Seinfeld wrote eight of the season's episodes. The writing staff was joined by Larry Charles, who wrote three episodes, and Peter Mehlman, who wrote  "The Apartment".

Starting with the season premiere, filming of the show moved from Desilu Cahuenga, in Hollywood, California, to CBS Studio Center, in Studio City, Los Angeles, California. Tom Azzari worked as set designer during season two; he often re-used sets from the first season, because Castle Rock Entertainment had rented a large storage facility in which sets were stored, to save money. Although the scenes in Monk's Cafe were filmed at CBS Studio Center, the exterior of Tom's Restaurant, a diner at the intersection of Broadway and 112th Street in Manhattan, was used as the exterior for the cafe. The second season of Seinfeld was supposed to start airing on January 16, 1991, but the premiere was postponed one week because of the commencement of the first Gulf War.

Unfilmed episode
"The Bet", also known as "The Gun", is an episode that was written for the second season, but was never filmed. In the episode, Elaine bets against Jerry on the ease of buying a handgun to protect herself. In a subplot, Kramer returns from a vacation in Puerto Rico and tells Jerry and George he had sex with a flight attendant during the flight back. George makes a bet with him and goes to the airport with Jerry and Elaine to ask the flight attendant if Kramer's claim is true.  Additionally, the episode would have revealed Kramer's first name as "Conrad"; his name was instead revealed as "Cosmo" in the season six episode "The Switch".

The episode was written by Charles to make a funny "dark-themed" episode, using elements that were unusual in sitcoms. Sets for the episode were built, and Bobbi Jo Lathan was cast as flight attendant Lucy Merrit and Ernie Sabella was cast as gun salesman Mo Korn, who was described in the script as "overweight, greasy, slow and low-key". The table reading of the episode was held on December 12, 1990. Louis-Dreyfus stated, "I read the script and I remember thinking 'we're not going to do this'." According to Alexander, when she read a scene in which she holds the gun to her head stating "where do you want it Jerry? The Kennedy? [holds the gun to her stomach] The McKinley?" (referencing the assassination of the two American presidents), Louis-Dreyfus turned to Alexander, stating "I'm not doing this." Both Alexander and Cherones, who would direct the episode, felt that the gun content in the story was too provocative. Richards was concerned that his character would be open about arming Elaine, though in a later interview he stated "although, why not? I think Kramer could justify the use of a weapon."

The cast began rehearsing, but after 20 minutes stopped and turned to Cherones, who agreed to talk to Charles. While on his way to Charles' office, Cherones met Castle Rock executive Glenn Padnick and informed him about the cast's reaction to the episode. Cherones said that Padnick was relieved to hear this, and they both discussed the problem with Charles, and decided not to use the script. Commenting on the episode, Charles stated "You know, it would have been an interesting show, but  we couldn't solve the funny problem of it. It never seemed to quite be as funny as it should be and, because of that, the balance was off and the darkness kind of enveloped it, and it could never really emerge from that darkness and become what it should have been. So, it was disappointing but also understandable." The replacement episode called "The Phone Message" was written by David and Seinfeld in two days.

Reception

The review aggregator website Rotten Tomatoes reported a 100% approval rating based on 17 critic reviews. The website's critics consensus reads, "Seinfelds comedic voice gets more confident in this much-improved second season, which better utilizes its supporting players to uproarious effect."

The start of season two received poor ratings, prompting NBC to put the show on hiatus for two months. When the series returned in its original timeslot behind Cheers, its high ratings and increasing popularity led NBC to order the full season. Seinfeld kept a large number of Cheers  viewers; the episode "The Apartment" was watched in 15.7 million American homes, while the Cheers episode that preceded it was watched by 20.5 million American homes. Ratings for the show remained high, eventually leading to a third season pickup. Season two received three Emmy Award nominations; series co-creator Larry David and Seinfeld were nominated in the category "Outstanding Writing in a Comedy Series" for writing the episode "The Pony Remark". Cherones was nominated for "Outstanding Directing in a Comedy Series" for directing "The Pony Remark". David was also nominated for the award for writing "The Deal". Although the show did not win an Emmy, Seinfeld was praised for co-hosting the Emmy telecast.

Critics reacted positively to the season. During its 1991 Program awards, Entertainment Weekly ranked Seinfeld second place in the "Program of the year" category, behind Roseanne. Joseph P. Kahn, a critic for the Wilmington Morning Star, praised the writing and acting of the season premiere and stated, "One safe prediction, Seinfeld will be here for a good long run this time around." Writing for The Spokesman-Review, critic Jon Burlingame stated that "Seinfeld is an offbeat take on the standard sitcom concept. While rarely hilarious, it's often smart and amusing." Dave Kehr of The New York Times felt that "The Pony Remark" was a turning point for the show, noting that after the first few episodes, the show "turn[ed] into something sharp and distinctive  Here, suddenly, is the tight knot of guilt and denial, of hypersensitivity and sarcastic contempt that Seinfeld would explore for the next eight years." Despite the critical acclaim for the season and several of its episodes, two of the season's episodes, "The Busboy" and "The Baby Shower", were named to a list of Seinfelds "Not-so-top episodes", compiled by the New York Daily News.

Episodes

References
General
 
 
 

Inline citations and notes

External links

 
 
 

2
1991 American television seasons